Awok was an e-commerce company headquartered in Dubai, UAE. The company used to sell items such as clothing, fashion accessories, kitchenware, home appliances, consumer electronics and beauty products. Awok closed its business in the month of August 2020 due to global financial situation, as said by the company in their website.

History 
Awok was founded in 2013 by Ulugbek Yuldashev. The company was headquartered in Dubai, UAE.

The platform closed due to pressures from the Coronavirus pandemic.

See also 

 E-commerce
 Online shopping

References

External links
 

Companies based in Dubai
Retail companies established in 2013
Internet properties established in 2013
Online retailers of the United Arab Emirates